Nathan O'Toole (born 17 March 1998) is an Irish actor. He is known for his role as a young Bjorn Ironside in the first, second and fourth seasons of the History series Vikings. O'Toole made his television debut at 13 in the Showtime series The Borgias as Vincenzo.

Early life
O'Toole grew up in Dunshaughlin, County Meath with three siblings. He attended St. Seachnall National School and then Dunshaughlin Community College. He began taking acting classes with Ann Kavanagh's Young People's Theatre when he was 10. He then went on to train at Bow Street Academy in Dublin.

Filmography

References

External links

Living people
1998 births
21st-century Irish male actors
Actors from County Meath
Alumni of the Bow Street Academy
Irish male child actors
Irish male television actors